Still Pond Historic District is a national historic district located at Still Pond in Kent County, Maryland, United States. The district contains approximately 75 buildings dating from the early 19th century through the 1930s.  Notable structures include the Still Pond Methodist Church, the George Harper Store, the Medders-Krebs House, a former Odd Fellows Hall, and a former schoolhouse.

It was listed on the National Register of Historic Places in 2009.

References

External links
, at Maryland Historical Trust
Still Pond Historic District boundary map

Houses on the National Register of Historic Places in Maryland
Historic districts in Kent County, Maryland
Houses in Kent County, Maryland
Historic districts on the National Register of Historic Places in Maryland
National Register of Historic Places in Kent County, Maryland